The Singles Ward film series consists of two low-budget Christian comedies based on original characters, co-written by Kurt Hale and John Moyer. The overall premise centers around members of The Church of Jesus Christ of Latter-day Saints who are not yet married and their religious congregational groups,  known as wards. The story details the humorous experiences for attendees of church in these congregations.

Films

The Singles Ward (2002)

After faithfully serving a full-time mission as a Latter-day Saint, then getting married, Jonathan Jordan finds himself divorced and once again an attending member of one the church's single-adult world. As he attends a congregation specifically for unmarried adults, where the ultimate goal is eternal marriage he quickly becomes disenchanted with the experience and stops going to church. As he copes with his experiences, he creates a standup routine lampooning the nature and lifestyle of being a member. His resistance to the church continues, until he falls for Cammie Giles who is an active member at a local singles ward. Suddenly, Jordan finds church attendance more appealing, but begins to question whether he is going for the right reasons or if it is just to impress his new girlfriend.

The Singles 2nd Ward (2007)

Dalen Martin, a young professor at Brigham Young University becomes engaged to his girlfriend Christine, who is an attending student at the collect and also a recent convert to The Church of Jesus Christ of Latter-day Saints. As the couple prepared for their upcoming wedding, Christine's divorced parents arrive, with their new partners, for the occasion. The couple explores their relationship and preparations while attending the church's congregation of single adults. Dalen tries to create a lasting relationship with Christine's separated parents, who are critical of the religion, and assists his friend Jonathan with developing a feature film based on his experiences in a Latter-day Saint singles ward. Together, Dalen and Christine build on their love and look forward to being married in a Latter-day Saint Temple, though must also explain to her parents why they cannot attend the marriage ceremony.

The Real Life Singles Ward (2011)

Filmed in a documentary style, the movie follows the real-world experiences of a few Latter-day Saints attending their singles ward activities. Over the course of the production, the project examines the positives and negatives of dating; while exploring the young men's journey in trying to find their eternal companion through various aspects of the process including engagement for someone who is divorced versus never married. Each of the young men answer questions regarding their faith, and their desires to grow closer to God in their pursuits at church.

Main cast and characters

Additional crew and production details

Reception

In the book Religious Humor in Evangelical Christian and Mormon Culture, Elisha McIntyre highlighted the proposal scene between Dalen and Christine, stating that it was "a delicate balance of the serious and humorous mode."

Box office and financial performance

Critical response

In other media

The Singles Ward soundtrack
The soundtrack is a collection of Latter Day Saint artists performing songs from the Hymns of The Church of Jesus Christ of Latter-day Saints and the Children's Songbook. The soundtrack album was released by Guapo Records.
 "The Church of Jesus Christ"Magstatic
 "Come, Come Ye Saints"Slender
 "There is Sunshine in My Soul Today"Ponchillo
 "Do What is Right"Mismash
 "Popcorn Popping"Rooster
 "Book of Mormon Stories"Pipe Dream
 "In Our Lovely Deseret"Mr. Fusion
 "Keep the Commandments"Mighty Mahogany
 "I Feel My Savior's Love"Mismash
 "We Are All Enlisted"Magstatic
 "Battle Hymn of the Republic" —Slender
 "Let Us All Press On"Mr. Fusion
 "When Grandpa Comes"Slender
 "God Be With You Till We Meet Again"Jamen Brooks

References

External links
 
 
 Infants on Thrones podcast review of the movie

2002 films
2002 romantic comedy films
Mormon cinema
Films shot in Utah
Halestorm Entertainment films
2000s English-language films